Hello Stranger may refer to:

 Hello Stranger (song), a 1963 song by Barbara Lewis
 "Hello Stranger", a 1930s song by the Carter Family
 Hello Stranger (2010 film), a Thai film
 Hello Stranger (upcoming film), an American thriller film
 Hello! Stranger, a South Korean TV series
 Hello Stranger (web series), a 2020 Philippine web series
 Hello Stranger, a rock band with Juliette Commagere as lead singer, and its 2006 self-titled album